Arren Bar-Even (6 June 1980 - 18 September 2020) was an Israeli Biochemist and Synthetic Biologist. In his research, Bar-Even made pioneering advances in the design and implementation of novel pathways for improved CO2 fixation. and formate utilisation.

Education and career 
Bar-Even obtained his bachelor's degree in the excellence program from the Faculty of Biology from Technion, the Israeli Institute of Technology in 2002. He then completed his master's degree in Bioinformatics at the Weizmann Institute of Science in 2005. After working as a consultant in the biotech industry for some years, he returned to academia to complete a PhD degree in biochemistry at the Weizmann Institute of Science in 2012. In his work with Ron Milo as his supervisor, he specialized in the design principles of cellular metabolism. From 2015, Bar-Even became junior research group leader of the “Systems and Synthetic Metabolism” lab at the Max Planck Institute of Molecular Plant Physiology.

Research 
Already in his PhD at the Weizmann Institute, Bar-Even made advances in metabolic engineering. He extended our basic understanding of the general features of enzymes and metabolic pathways, in a series of insightful meta-analyses of key design principles of metabolism. This deep grasp of the fundamentals of how metabolism operates and evolves was a basis for his advances in metabolic engineering. These included the invention of a multitude of novel pathways for synthetic carbon fixation, formate assimilation, photorespiration bypasses, and significant contributions to the establishment of the predominant CO2 fixation cycle – the Calvin-Benson cycle – in E. coli.

Based on formate, Bar-Even established the idea of a formate bio-economy with the potential to revolutionize food- and feedstock production among other biotechnological sectors for a circular carbon economy. In the formate bio-economy, formate is produced from CO2 physiochemically using renewable energy sources and subsequently fed as sole carbon source to engineered microbes to produce a myriad of products, such as fuels, other value-added chemicals, food and feedstock.

After starting his own lab at the Max Planck Institute of Molecular Plant Physiology, Bar-Even worked among other projects on the biological realisation of the formate bio-economy. This mainly consisted of engineering model organisms (e.g. E. coli, S. cerevisiae, etc.) towards formatotrophic growth – the ability to grow on formate as a sole carbon source. In 2020, this goal was achieved with the demonstration of the first synthetic formatotrophic E. coli cells growing via the reductive glycine pathway, a synthetic pathway designed by Bar-Even and only later found to operate in nature. Notably, the engineered cells could also grow on methanol as sole carbon source, which had been a long-standing goal of synthetic biology.

References

External links
 ResearchGate profile

1980 births
2020 deaths
21st-century biologists
Israeli biologists
Israeli biochemists
Synthetic biologists
Technion – Israel Institute of Technology alumni
Weizmann Institute of Science alumni
Max Planck Institutes researchers